The 2014 United States Senate election in Tennessee took place on November 4, 2014, to elect a member of the United States Senate from the State of Tennessee. Incumbent Republican U.S. Senator Lamar Alexander defeated Democrat Gordon Ball, and was re-elected to a third term in office with 61.9% of the vote against 31.9%.

Lamar Alexander narrowly kept Shelby County in his column. Home to Memphis, Shelby County hasn't voted Republican on a presidential level since 1988. Notably, Alexander flipped reliably Democratic Haywood County which hasn't voted Republican on a presidential level since 1972, but has been trending Republican in recent years. However, he did lose Davidson County, a county which he narrowly flipped back in 2008. This county is home to Tennessee's Capital, Nashville.

Background 
Alexander was reelected with 65.1% of the vote in the 2008 election. Alexander stepped down from his leadership role as Republican Conference Chairman of the United States Senate in 2011, but announced that he would seek re-election to a third term. Nashville businessman, counseling executive and former 2012 U.S. Senate candidate Larry Crim filed his announcement of candidacy with the Secretary of the United States Senate in January 2013.

Republican primary 
Although Alexander was initially thought to be vulnerable to a primary challenge from the right, he worked to avoid this and ultimately did not face a high-profile challenger. He declared his intention to run early, quickly won the endorsement of Governor Bill Haslam, every living former Tennessee Republican Party Chairman and the state's entire Republican congressional delegation (except scandal-hit Scott DesJarlais). He also raised a large amount of money and worked to avoid the mistakes of ousted Senators Bob Bennett and Richard Lugar by trying to stay in touch with his constituents, especially in East Tennessee. Moreover, out-of-state conservative organizations such as the Senate Conservatives Fund made little effort to defeat Alexander.

During his re-election campaign in 2008, Alexander faced no opponents in the Republican primary. As early as July 2013, it was obvious that the same would not be true in 2014. The weekend of July 20, 2013, a rally was held in Smyrna in opposition to Alexander. Activists attending the event included Williamson County GOP leader Kevin Kookogey. By mid-August, Triton Polling released a poll showing Alexander trailing "a generic conservative" by 4.6 points. But no "generic conservative" seemed to want to step up. In search of a candidate, a "Beat Lamar" PAC held a forum and invited Kookogey, Knox County mayor Tim Burchett, and Alexander's only formal opponent at the time, Brenda Lenard of Knoxville.

On August 20, 2013, State Representative Joe Carr announced his candidacy. He had previously been opposing Scott Desjarlais in the race for Tennessee's 4th congressional district, but swapped races under public pressure. Kookogey soon dropped out of the race. Four candidates were then vetted in September by the "Coalition for a Constitutional Senate": Carr, truck driver Jerry Davis, business owner John McDaniel, and electrician Danny Page. The coalition ultimately endorsed Carr with 59% of the vote, but some felt that Carr's nomination was coerced by the leaders of the Beat Lamar PAC. Independent candidate Danny Page was especially vocal on that issue.

Entering the race late was George Flinn, a radiologist from Memphis who had run for Congress against Steve Cohen in 2012. There was some speculation that Flinn was a spoiler deployed by Alexander to steal Tea Party votes from Carr.

In the primary's final stretch Carr was endorsed by Sarah Palin, but he did not receive much other support from outside of Tennessee, failing to receive endorsements from the Senate Conservatives Fund or the Club for Growth.

Ultimately, Alexander won the primary, though he recorded the lowest winning percentage (49.7%) and lowest margin of victory (9.2 points) ever in a primary for a Republican U.S. Senator from Tennessee. Carr won a larger percentage of the vote (40.5%) than the previous 11 challengers to sitting Republican U.S. Senators in Tennessee history combined (40.3%).

Candidates

Declared 
 Christian Agnew
 Lamar Alexander, incumbent U.S. Senator
 Joe Carr, state representative
 George Flinn, radiologist, radio station owner, former Shelby County Commissioner and nominee for Tennessee's 9th congressional district in 2012
 John King, businessman
 Brenda Lenard, doctoral student at the University of Tennessee and candidate for the U.S. Senate in 2012
 Erin Kent Magee

Withdrew 
 Danny Page, electrician (running as an Independent)

Declined 
 Diane Black, U.S. Representative
 Marsha Blackburn, U.S. Representative
 Tim Burchett, Mayor of Knox County
 Stacey Campfield, state senator
 Jimmy Duncan, U.S. Representative
 Stephen Fincher, U.S. Representative
 Chuck Fleischmann, U.S. Representative
 Mark Green, state senator
 Glenn Jacobs (Kane), professional wrestler
 Kevin Kookogey, former Chairman of the Williamson County Republican Party
 Monty Lankford, businessman, board member of the Tennessee Family Action Council and nominee for Tennessee's 4th congressional district in 2008
 Ron Ramsey, Lieutenant Governor and Speaker of the Tennessee Senate
 Phil Roe, U.S. Representative

Endorsements

Polling 

 * Internal poll for Lamar Alexander campaign
 ^ Internal Poll for Terry Adams campaign

Results

Democratic primary

Declared 
 Terry Adams, attorney
 Gordon Ball, attorney
 Larry Crim, candidate for the U.S. Senate in 2012
 Gary Gene Davis, perennial candidate

Withdrew 
 Jacob Maurer, high school educator and write-in candidate for the U.S. Senate in 2012

Declined 
 Phil Bredesen, former Governor of Tennessee
 Joe Brown, arbiter of the CBS television series Judge Joe Brown and former Shelby County Criminal Court judge
 Craig Fitzhugh, Minority Leader of the Tennessee House of Representatives
 Roy Herron, Chairman of the Tennessee Democratic Party, former state senator and nominee for Tennessee's 8th congressional district in 2010

Endorsements

Results

General election

Candidates 
 Lamar Alexander (Republican), incumbent U.S. Senator
 Gordon Ball (Democratic), attorney
 Tom Emerson, Jr. (Independent)
 Edmund Gauthier (Independent)
 Joshua James (Independent)
 Danny Page (Independent), electrician
 Bartholomew Phillips (Independent)
 Martin Pleasant (Green)
 C. Salekin (Independent)
 Eric Schecter (Independent)
 Rick Tyler (Independent)
 Joe Wilmoth (Constitution), candidate for the State Senate in 2010

Endorsements

Debates 
The first was held in Chattanooga, Tennessee sponsored by Democrats United For Tennessee Inc. and Central Labor Council Members which included 15 Candidates for state and federal office attended by Larry Crim for U.S. Senate  (The Chattanoogan).  Crim criticized Senators Bob Corker of Chattanooga and Lamar Alexander of Nashville for overreaching into the free enterprise of VW and their works councils which Mr. Crim stated also implicated free association rights of the company, workers and labor and the free vote.(http://www.chattanoogan.com/2014/3/3/270950/Tennessee-Democratic-Candidates-And.aspx) (The Chattanoogan).  U.S. Senate candidate Larry Crim and UAW International Rep. Tom Savage spoke on the importance of free elections at the Volkswagen plant in Chattanooga at the candidate debate.  The candidate debate and forum was held at the Kingdom Center of Olivet Baptist Church. Mr. Crim said, "Protecting voter rights for a free and fair election are as fundamental to expressing the will of workers in the workplace as it is to Americans at the polling place".  "For a U.S. Senator to offer incentives or threaten withdrawing public resources based on whether workers vote to recognize the union interferes with their free choice" continued the Democratic candidate for United States Senate. "It seems clear that there was an overreach here and I stand with labor on that" said Crim.

The second debate was held in Bolivar, Tennessee and attended by Democrats Gordon Ball and Terry Adams, Republican George Flinn, and independents Ed Gauthier and Danny Page. The attendees criticized Alexander and Carr for not attending.

The third was a "candidates' forum" after the primary in Cookeville on October 16. Only Republican nominee Lamar Alexander and Democrat nominee Gordon Ball were allowed to participate.

The fourth debate was on October 23 at a Sheraton Hotel across from the Tennessee State Capitol in Nashville. The nominees for the Democratic Party (Gordon Ball), Libertarian Party (Joshua James), Green Party (Martin Pleasant), and Constitution Party (Joe Wilmoth) were all in attendance as well as independents Tom Emerson, Ed Gauthier, and Danny Page. The moderator was blogger Tom Humphrey of the blog "Humphrey on the Hill". The candidates discussed a number of issues, including abortion, The Islamic State, Common Core education standards, and global warming, but the issue that stuck most with the media was marijuana. There was a general consensus among the seven candidates in attendance that the federal government should not be involved in the issue, and that authority on marijuana should be reserved to the states and people. Incumbent Senator Lamar Alexander declined to participate in the debate, and was mocked by Democrat Gordon Ball as being "chicken". Alexander was speaking in front of various groups in Nashville and Murfreesboro that day.

The fifth and sixth debates were held in Johnson City and Crossville, and featured candidates Gordon Ball and Danny Page. Senator Alexander was invited, but attended neither.

Campaign 
In September, an education summit was held in Nashville by Governor Bill Haslam. A protest of the summit (which was largely a protest of the "Common Core" standards) was attended by Democrat Gordon Ball and independent Danny Page.

In late September, eleven members of the Tennessee General Assembly who had backed Joe Carr in the primaries announced they would back Alexander in the general election, saying, "We feel that it is vitally important to the country that we stand together and support replacing the liberal agenda that is now in control of the United States Senate". Carr himself abstained from the endorsement.

Predictions

Polling 

With Adams

 ^ Internal poll for Terry Adams campaign

Results

See also 
 2014 United States Senate elections
 2014 United States elections
 2014 United States House of Representatives elections in Tennessee
 2014 Tennessee gubernatorial election

References

External links 
 U.S. Senate elections in Tennessee, 2014 at Ballotpedia
 Campaign contributions at OpenSecrets

Official campaign websites
 Terry Adams for U.S. Senate
 Lamar Alexander for U.S. Senate
 Gordon Ball for U.S. Senate
 Joe Carr for U.S. Senate
 Larry Crim for U.S. Senate
 Brenda Lenard for U.S. Senate
 Danny Page for U.S. Senate
 E.L. Gauthier for U.S. Senate

2014
Tennessee
2014 Tennessee elections